B.B. King in London is a studio album by B.B. King, recorded in London in 1971. He is accompanied by US session musicians and various British rock- and R&B musicians, including Ringo Starr, Alexis Korner and Gary Wright, as well as members of Spooky Tooth and Humble Pie, Greg Ridley, Steve Marriott, and Jerry Shirley.

The album was released in the United Kingdom on November 19, 1971, in order to coincide with the first date of King's tour of the country.

John Lennon had announced that he would perform on some of the tracks, but ended up having no involvement with the album.

Track listing 
"Caldonia" (Fleecie Moore) -- 4:01
"Blue Shadows" (Lloyd Glenn) -- 5:11
"Alexis' Boogie" (Alexis Korner) -- 3:30
"We Can't Agree" (Wilhelmina Gray, Louis Jordan) -- 4:48
"Ghetto Woman" (Dave Clark, B.B. King) -- 5:15
"Wet Hayshark" [instrumental] (Gary Wright) -- 2:29
"Part-Time Love" (Clay Hammond) -- 3:17
"Power of the Blues" (Pete Wingfield) -- 2:23
"Ain't Nobody Home" (Jerry Ragovoy) -- 3:09

Personnel 
B. B. King – lead guitar, lead vocals
John Uribe – guitar (tracks 2, 4, 9)
Peter Green – guitar on "Caldonia" 
Alexis Korner – guitar on "Alexis' Boogie" 
David Spinozza – guitar (track 9) 
Paul Butler – guitar 
Klaus Voormann – bass guitar 
John Best – bass guitar
Greg Ridley – bass guitar on "Alexis' Boogie"
Steve Winwood – Hammond organ
Gary Wright – piano, Hammond organ
Dr Ragovoy – piano 
Pete Wingfield – piano
Dr. John – keyboards (and guitar on track 5)  
Rick Wright – keyboards
Joshie Armstead – background vocals
Tasha Thomas – background vocals
Carl Hall – background vocals
Jim Price – trumpet, trombone, piano, Fender Rhodes
Bobby Keys – tenor saxophone
Steve Marriott – harmonica on "Alexis' Boogie"
Duster Bennett – harmonica
Bill Perkins – baritone saxophone, clarinet
Ollie Mitchell – trumpet
Chuck Findley – trombone
Ringo Starr – drums (tracks 5, 6, 7)
Jerry Shirley – drums on "Alexis' Boogie"
Jim Gordon – drums 
Jim Keltner – drums 
Barry Ford – drums
Jimmie Haskell - string arrangement, conductor on "Ghetto Woman"
Technical
Andy Hendriksen, Baker Bigsby, Chris Kimsey, Eddie James, Joe Venneri, John Stronach, Lee Kiefer, Pete Booth, Phillip Holland, Rufus Cartwright, Tom Brown - engineer
Keith Morris - photography

References

External links
Alexis Korner discography

1971 albums
B.B. King albums
ABC Records albums
Albums arranged by Jimmie Haskell
Albums recorded at Olympic Sound Studios